Philippe Julien Albert (born 10 August 1967) is a Belgian former professional footballer and television pundit.

As a player he was a defender. He played for Charleroi, KV Mechelen and Anderlecht in his native Belgium, and for English clubs Newcastle United and Fulham. It was at Newcastle that he became known as an attack-minded centre-back for his forward runs from defence in the team dubbed as "the Entertainers".

Albert made 41 appearances for the Belgium national team from 1987 to 1997, and represented his country at the 1990 and 1994 World Cups.

Club career
Albert started his career with Charleroi before moving to KV Mechelen where his performances won him Belgian Golden Shoe and a move to Anderlecht. While playing at Anderlecht, he won the Belgian League twice and helped his national side qualify for the 1994 World Cup.

Albert's exploits at the World Cup earned him a £2.6 million transfer to Kevin Keegan's Newcastle United; he was issued the number 27 shirt, and completed the transfer on his 27th birthday. He later claimed he turned down moves to Italian clubs Juventus and Fiorentina the year before as he did not like the hot climate or having to play on Sundays, and moved to Newcastle as he was a fan of Keegan and the team he played for, Liverpool, in his youth. He was an immediate success in the side as he helped them win their first six league games of the 1994–95 season, but missed the later stages of the season through injury and Newcastle finished sixth – not even enough for a UEFA Cup place. He became a cult hero at Newcastle United due to his less-than-defensive tendencies in "the Entertainers'" central defence, would often make runs forward and be found roaming on the edge of the opposition box. His most famous moment arguably came when he scored an audacious chip from 20 yards over Peter Schmeichel in a 5–0 win over Manchester United on 20 October 1996.

Fans at Newcastle created a terrace chant for the player, singing "Phillipe, Phillipe Albert, everyone knows his name" to the words of the theme song of 1970s children's TV series The Adventures of Rupert Bear.

Injuries towards the end of the decade limited his first-team chances and he spent 13 games on loan to third-tier club Fulham (managed at the time by his former Newcastle boss Keegan), scoring twice during the 1998–99 season as they were promoted from Division Two as champions.

On leaving Newcastle in 1999, Albert returned to Belgium, rejoining Charleroi for £600,000. He spent one season with the club before retiring from football.

International career
Albert made 41 appearances for the Belgium national team, making his debut in 1987, but came to worldwide prominence at the 1994 FIFA World Cup. There he played in four of Belgium's matches, scoring against the Netherlands in his first game and against Germany in the second round match, which Belgium lost 3–2.

Post-playing career
Albert is now working as a pundit for Belgian TV, and also runs a successful fruit and vegetable company.

Honours

Club 
KV Mechelen

 Belgian First Division: 1988–89
 European Super Cup: 1988
 Amsterdam Tournament: 1989
Joan Gamper Trophy: 1989
 Jules Pappaert Cup: 1990

Anderlecht
 Belgian First Division: 1990–91, 1992–93, 1993–94
 Belgian Cup: 1993–94
 Belgian Super Cup: 1993

Newcastle 

Premier League runner up: 1995-96, 1996-97

Fulham
 Football League Second Division: 1998–99

Individual 
 Belgian Professional Footballer of the Year: 1991–92
 Belgian Golden Shoe: 1992
 Ballon 'd Or nomination: 1994
 Greatest Newcastle United XI: 2017
DH Best Anderlecht Team Ever: 2020
RBFA 125 Years Icons Team: 2020

References

External links

Premier League profile
 at Belgian FA

1967 births
Living people
People from Bouillon
1990 FIFA World Cup players
1994 FIFA World Cup players
Belgian expatriate footballers
Belgian expatriate sportspeople in England
Belgian Pro League players
Belgian footballers
Belgium international footballers
Expatriate footballers in England
Association football central defenders
Newcastle United F.C. players
Premier League players
R. Charleroi S.C. players
R.S.C. Anderlecht players
English Football League players
Walloon sportspeople
K.V. Mechelen players
Fulham F.C. players
Footballers from Luxembourg (Belgium)